The Hawaii Symphony Orchestra, formerly known as Honolulu Symphony Orchestra, was founded in 1900. It is the second oldest orchestra in the USA west of the Rocky Mountains. The orchestra now plays at Neal S. Blaisdell Concert Hall and the Hawaii Theatre Center in Honolulu.

The orchestra was originally housed in a clubhouse on the slopes of Punchbowl. From 1996 to 2004, the orchestra was under the direction of conductor Samuel Wong.  In August 2007, Andreas Delfs, current music director of the Milwaukee Symphony Orchestra, officially became principal conductor of the orchestra.  He led seven concerts per season in the orchestra's Halekulani Masterworks series. From 2010 to present, JoAnn Falletta has served as the artistic advisor of the Hawaii Symphony Orchestra. Ignace Jang is concertmaster.

Previous music directors included Fritz Hart (1937–49), George Barati (1950-1967), Robert La Marchina, Donald Johanos (1979–94) and JoAnn Falletta (artistic advisor).

In 2014, the Hawaii Symphony Orchestra debuted its popular series musicthatPOPS, featuring Broadway music, Disney in Concert, Cirque de la Symphonie and Zelda in Concert, among others.

History
The symphony has undergone a series of transformations over the course of its first century. It has endured two World Wars, the Great Depression, financial crises, and changing musical and cultural fashions.

On October 30, 2009, the Honolulu Symphony Society's board of directors voted to file for Chapter 11 protection.  On November 6, 2009, the symphony announced the cancellation of concerts for the remainder of the 2009–2010 season. The organization said it was $1 million in debt and did not have enough money to support operations into November and beyond.

In 2010, facing a multimillion-dollar deficit, the symphony disbanded under Chapter 7 of the U.S. Bankruptcy Code, but was revived the next year under the new name "Hawaii Symphony Orchestra" by a group of Honolulu businessmen. JoAnn Falletta was appointed artistic director, and Steven Monder, former director of the Cincinnati Symphony Orchestra, was appointed president.

In May 2010, the symphony's leaders said their goal was to decrease annual expenses to $4 million, from $8 million previously. The symphony's 40-performance calendar would also be cut in half, with performances at smaller venues and different ticket prices, aiming to fill all seats with paying customers. The symphony was given an October 15 deadline to file its Chapter 11 plan of reorganization.  In December 2010 it was announced that the symphony would be liquidated under Chapter 7 and end operations after 110 years.

In April 2011, a group of Hawaii businesspeople called the Symphony Exploratory Committee announced efforts to revive the symphony. The committee bought out the symphony's assets, and negotiated a new three-year contract with the musicians, planning to open a new season in fall of 2011.

References

External links
 Symphony website
 Archive of Hawaii Romance Festival 2008

Musical groups established in 1900
Culture of Honolulu
Wikipedia requested audio of orchestras
Native Hawaiian musicians
Musical groups from Hawaii
American orchestras
1900 establishments in Hawaii
Performing arts in Hawaii
Orchestras based in Hawaii
Video game musicians
Film scores